Omobranchus obliquus, the roundhead blenny or the mangrove blenny, is a species of combtooth blenny found in coral reefs in the Pacific and Indian oceans.  This species can grow to a length of  SL.

References

obliquus
Taxa named by Samuel Garman
Fish described in 1903